Houses At 16-22 East Lee Street is a block of historic homes located at Hagerstown, Washington County, Maryland, United States. They area group of five, -story frame rowhouses.  The buildings rest on  brick and stone foundations and have two inner open passageways leading from the street to the rear elevations.  They are an important example of lower middle class domestic architecture in Hagerstown, erected about 1894.

The houses were listed on the National Register of Historic Places in 1977. Much of the houses' detailing has been covered by vinyl siding and aluminum trim.

References

External links
, including photo from 1976, at Maryland Historical Trust

American middle class
Houses on the National Register of Historic Places in Maryland
Houses completed in 1894
Houses in Hagerstown, Maryland
National Register of Historic Places in Washington County, Maryland